Cap is the nickname of the following people:

 Charles A. Allen (Los Angeles), city councilman in the 1940s
 Cap Anson (1852–1922), American Major League Baseball player
 Charles E. Barham (1904–1972), American politician, Lieutenant Governor of Louisiana (1952–1956)
 Cap Boso (born 1963), American former National Football League player
 Irwin Caplan (1919–2007), American illustrator, painter, designer and cartoonist
 Wilbur Wade Card (1873–1948), American baseball player, coach and athletic director at Duke University
 Forrest Craver (1875–1958), American college football player and coach and athletic director
 Cap Crowell (1892–1962), American Major League Baseball pitcher
 Cap Dierks (born 1932), American politician
 Cap Edwards (1888–?), National Football League coach and player
 Cap Fear (1901–1978), Canadian Football League player
 Ernest R. Graham (politician) (1886–1957), American politician
 Walthall Robertson Joyner (1854–1925), mayor of Atlanta, Georgia
 Austin E. Lathrop (1865–1950), American industrialist and outspoken opponent of Alaskan statehood
 Bill Narleski (1900–1964), American  Major League Baseball player
 John Oehler (1910–1983), American National Football League player
 Cap Peterson (1942–1980), American Major League Baseball player
 Cap Raeder (born 1953), American former World Hockey Association goaltender and National Hockey League coach
 Joseph Shaw (editor) (1874–1952), American magazine editor and fencer
 George Streeter (1837–1921), American crook
 Andrew Tilles (1865–1951), American business magnate and philanthropist
 Cap Timm (1908–1987), longest-tenured college baseball coach for the Iowa State University Cyclones 
 Caspar Weinberger (1917–2006), American politician and businessman, Secretary of Defense under President Reagan
 Clarence W. Wigington (1883–1967), African-American architect
 Marsh Williams (1893–1935), American Major League Baseball pitcher in 1916

See also 
 
 
 Cappy (disambiguation)
 Sarge (nickname)

Lists of people by nickname